This is a list of video games that use Mii avatars, sorted by console.

Wii

Retail games

WiiWare titles

Wii U

Retail games

Download Software

Games

Non-game applications

Nintendo DS
Since the Nintendo DS lacks a native Mii Maker, the following games support Miis through the ability to import them from a Wii console. Tomodachi Collection, Ide Yousuke's Healthy Mahjong DSI, Kuruma De DS and Personal Trainer: Walking also feature in-game Mii Makers.

Nintendo 3DS

Retail games

Nintendo eShop exclusive titles

Nintendo Switch

Mobile

Notes

References

Miis
Miis